Martina Hennen (born 24 August 1972) is a German former footballer who played as a defender. She made nine appearances for the Germany national team from 1993 to 1994.

References

External links
 

1972 births
Living people
German women's footballers
Women's association football defenders
Germany women's international footballers
Place of birth missing (living people)